The 2012 Mobil 1 presents the Grand Prix of Mosport was a multi-class sports car and GT motor race held at Canadian Tire Motorsport Park in Ontario, Canada on July 22, 2012. It was the fifth round of the 2012 American Le Mans Series season and the 30th Grand Prix of Mosport. The race was held a two hour and 45 minute time period, during which 117 laps of the 3.9 kilometre circuit were completed for a race distance of 463 kilometres.

The race was won by the Muscle Milk Pickett Racing team. German drivers Lucas Luhr and Klaus Graf driving a HPD ARX-03a Honda sports car took an eleven second victory over the Dyson Racing Team run Lola B12/60 sports car. It was the fourth consecutive victory for Luhr and Graf and also for both drivers it was their third victories in the Grand Prix of Mosport.

Third place, and first in the P2 division was Conquest Endurance team of Martin Plowman and David Heinemeier Hansson in their Morgan LMP2. It was their first victory in the class and the first time Level 5 Motorsports had not won in the 2012 season. Any chance Level 5's HPD ARX-03b had of victory ended when Christophe Bouchut acquired a stop-go penalty late in the race crossing the blend-line at the exit of pit lane.

Fifth was the second Dyson Racing Team Lola-Mazda ahead of the PC class winners, the RSR Racing pair of Bruno Junqueira and Tomy Drissi in their Oreca FLM09. It was the team's first victory in the Prototype Challenge class.

Tenth outright was the GT class winners, Extreme Speed Motorsports pair of Scott Sharp and Johannes van Overbeek in their Ferrari 458 Italia. It was the first win of the year for Ferrari and the fourth different manufacturer to win in GT in five races. It was also Extreme Speed's debut ALMS win. The Ferrari crossed the finish line in second position, just behind the Flying Lizard Motorsports Porsche of Jörg Bergmeister and Patrick Long but the Porsche failed post-race scrutineering. Van Overbeek only moved into the race winning position on the last lap after Jan Magnussen's Chevrolet Corvette slide wide while attacking Bergmeister for the lead of the class.

Back in 19th were the GT Challenge class winners, TRG driver Emilio Di Guida and Spencer Pumpelly.

22 of the 26 entries were running at races conclusion.

Race

Race result
Class winners in bold.  Cars failing to complete 70% of their class winner's distance are marked as Not Classified (NC).

References

External links
 2012 Grand Prix of Mosport Race Broadcast (American Le Mans Series YouTube Channel)

Mosport
Grand Prix of Mosport
Grand Prix of Mosport